Crocus longiflorus, the long-flowered crocus, is a species of flowering plant in the genus Crocus of the family Iridaceae, found in Southwest Italy, Sicilia, and Malta.

It produces pale lilac or purple blooms in autumn, along with the sword-shaped leaves.

In cultivation in the UK, this plant is a recipient of the Royal Horticultural Society's Award of Garden Merit.

References

longiflorus
Plants described in 1810